Judith Weir  (born 11 May 1954) is a British composer serving as Master of the King's Music. Appointed in 2014 by Queen Elizabeth II, Weir is the first woman to hold this office.

Biography
Weir was born in Cambridge, England, to Scottish parents. She studied with John Tavener while at the North London Collegiate School and subsequently with Robin Holloway at King's College, Cambridge, graduating in 1976. Her music often draws on sources from medieval history, as well as the traditional stories and music of her parents' homeland, Scotland. Although she has achieved international recognition for her orchestral and chamber works, Weir is best known for her operas and theatrical works. From 1995 to 2000, she was Artistic Director of the Spitalfields Festival in London. She held the post of Composer in Association for the City of Birmingham Symphony Orchestra from 1995 to 1998.

Weir was appointed a Commander of the Order of the British Empire (CBE) in the 1995 Birthday Honours for services to music. She received the Lincoln Center's Stoeger Prize in 1997, the South Bank Show music award in 2001 and the Incorporated Society of Musicians' Distinguished Musician Award in 2010. In 2007, she was the third recipient of the Queen's Medal for Music. She was a visiting distinguished research professor in composition at Cardiff University from 2006 to 2009.

On 30 June 2014, The Guardian stated that her appointment as Master of the Queen's Music, succeeding Sir Peter Maxwell Davies (whose term of office expired in March 2014), would be announced; this was officially confirmed on 21 July. She was appointed for a decade. In May 2015, Weir won The Ivors Classical Music Award at the Ivor Novello Awards.

Weir is a member of the Incorporated Society of Musicians. In 2018 she was elected an Honorary Fellow of the Royal Society of Edinburgh. In 2023, Weir was announced as one of the composers who would each create a brand new piece for the Coronation of Charles III and Camilla.

Music
Weir's musical language is fairly conservative, with a "knack of making simple musical ideas appear freshly mysterious". Her first stage work, The Black Spider, was a one-act opera which was premiered in Canterbury in 1985 loosely based on the short novel of the same name by Jeremias Gotthelf. She has subsequently written one more "micro-opera", three full-length operas, and an opera for television. In 1987, her first half-length opera, A Night at the Chinese Opera, was premiered at Kent Opera. This was followed by a further three full-length operas The Vanishing Bridegroom (1990), Blond Eckbert (1994), the latter commissioned by the English National Opera and Miss Fortune (Achterbahn) (2011). In 2005 her opera Armida, an opera for television, was premiered on Channel Four in the United Kingdom). The work was made in co-operation with Margaret Williams. Weir's commissioned works most notably include woman.life.song (2000) for Jessye Norman and We are Shadows (1999) for Simon Rattle. In January 2008, Weir was the focus of the BBC's annual composer weekend at the Barbican Centre in London. The four days of programmes ended with a first performance of her new commission, CONCRETE, a choral motet. The subject of this piece was inspired by the Barbican building itself – she describes it as 'an imaginary excavation of the Barbican Centre, burrowing through 2,500 years of historical rubble'.

The first public performance of Weir's arrangement of "God Save the Queen" was performed at the reburial of King Richard III at Leicester Cathedral on 26 March 2015. She was commissioned to compose an a cappella work for the state funeral of Elizabeth II on 19 September 2022, and wrote a setting of Psalm 42, "Like as the hart".

Opera and music theatre
 King Harald's Saga (1979, soprano, singing eight roles)
 The Black Spider (6 March 1985, Canterbury); also exists in an expanded version for Hamburg State Opera (8 February 2009, Hamburg)
 The Consolations of Scholarship (5 May 1985, Durham, soprano, chamber ensemble)
 A Night at the Chinese Opera (8 July 1987, Cheltenham)
 HEAVEN ABLAZE in His Breast (5 October 1989, Basildon), based on E.T.A. Hoffmann's The Sandman,  which won the prize for innovative work at OperaScreen in 1991.
 The Vanishing Bridegroom (1990, Glasgow); also exists in a chamber version (1990)
 Scipio's Dream (24 November 1991, television broadcast for the BBC), based on Il sogno di Scipione by Metastasio
 The Skriker (27 January 1994, London) – music for Caryl Churchill's play of the same name
 Blond Eckbert (20 April 1994, London); also exists in a so-called "pocket version" (reduced to one act from two) (2006)
 Armida (2005, television broadcast for Channel Four in the United Kingdom)
 Miss Fortune (opera) (Achterbahn "rollercoaster") (21 July 2011, Bregenzer Festspiele)

Other compositions
 Music for 247 Strings (1981, violin, piano)
 Thread! (1981, narrator, chamber ensemble)
 Scotch Minstrelsy (1982, tenor or soprano, piano)
 The Art of Touching the Keyboard (1983, piano)
 Missa Del Cid (1988, SAAATTTBBB choir), originally part of BBC's Sound on Film series; later used independently in concert and on stage.
 String Quartet (1990)
 Musicians Wrestle Everywhere (1994, flute, oboe, bass clarinet, horn, trombone, piano, cello, double bass)
 Forest (1995, orchestra)
 Piano Concerto (1997, piano, strings)
 Storm (1997, children's choir, SSAA choir, chamber ensemble)
 Natural History (1998, soprano, orchestra)
 Piano Trio (1998)
 We Are Shadows (1999, children's choir, SATB choir, orchestra)
 Piano Quartet (2000)
 woman.life.song (2000, premiered by Jessye Norman at Carnegie Hall, soprano, chamber ensemble)
 The welcome arrival of rain (2001, orchestra)
 Tiger Under the Table (2002, chamber ensemble)
 Piano Trio Two (2003–2004)
 Winter Song (2006, orchestra)
 CONCRETE (2007, speaker, SATB choir, orchestra)
 I give you the end of a golden string (2013, strings)
 In the Land of Uz (2017, SATB choir, soprano saxophone, trumpet, tuba, organ, viola, double bass)
 Oboe Concerto (2018, oboe, orchestra)
 The Prelude (2018–2019, flute, violin, viola, cello)
 The True Light (2018, SATB choir, organ) for the First World War centenary
 By Wisdom (2018, SATB choir, organ) for the Platinum Jubilee of Elizabeth II
 Like as the hart (2022, SATB choir, organ) for the state funeral of Elizabeth II.

Recordings
 Judith Weir: Discography
 A Night at the Chinese Opera – NMC D060
 King Harald's Saga – Cala CACD88040
 Piano Concerto; Distance and Enchantment; various other chamber works – NMC D090
 Blond Eckbert Nicholas Folwell (baritone), Blond Eckbert; Anne-Marie Owens (mezzo-soprano), Berthe; Christopher Ventris (tenor), Walther / Hugo / An Old Woman; Nerys Jones (soprano), A bird; Chorus and Orchestra of English National Opera; Sian Edwards (conductor) Collins Classics: CD14612 / NMC: NMC D106
 On Buying a Horse: The songs of Judith Weir On Buying a Horse; Ox Mountain Was Covered by Trees; Songs from the Exotic; Scotch Minstrelsy; The Voice of Desire; A Spanish Liederbooklet; King Harald's Saga; Ständchen. Susan Bickley (mezzo-soprano), Andrew Kennedy (tenor), Ailish Tynan (soprano), Ian Burnside (piano) Signum SIGCD087
 The Vanishing Bridegroom. Ailish Tynan (soprano), Anna Stéphany (soprano), Andrew Tortise (tenor), Owen Gilhooly (baritone), Jonathan Lemalu (bass-baritone), BBC Singers, BBC Symphony Orchestra; Martyn Brabbins (conductor) – NMC D196

References
Notes

Sources
 Warrack, John and West, Ewan (1992), The Oxford Dictionary of Opera, 782 pages,

External links 
 Achterbahn Bregenz 2011
 Judith Weir on the British Music Collection

1954 births
20th-century British composers
20th-century classical composers
21st-century British composers
21st-century classical composers
Academics of Cardiff University
Alumni of King's College, Cambridge
British women classical composers
British opera composers
Commanders of the Order of the British Empire
English people of Scottish descent
Women opera composers
Honorary Members of the Royal Academy of Music
Honorary Fellows of the Royal Society of Edinburgh
Living people
Masters of the King's Music
People educated at North London Collegiate School
People from Cambridge
20th-century women composers
21st-century women composers